Annasee is a lake in Beilstein,  Landkreis Heilbronn, Baden-Württemberg, Germany.

Lakes of Baden-Württemberg
LAnnasee